The Knights Templar trace their beginnings to the Latin Kingdom of Jerusalem in  when nine Christian knights, under the auspices of King Baldwin II and the Patriarch Warmund, were given the task of protecting pilgrims on the roads to Jerusalem, which they did for nine years until elevated to a military order at the Council of Troyes in 1129. They became an elite fighting force in the Crusades known for their propensity not to retreat or surrender.

Eventually, their rules of secrecy, their power, privileges and their wealth, made them vulnerable to the King of France's accusations and, with the Pope's unsuccessful attempts to prevent it, their destruction. The Templar leader, Master Jacques de Molay had recently come to France for meetings with the pope. In 1307, members of the Templar order in France were suddenly charged with heresy and arrested. In France, many ultimately, including their leader, were burned at the stake while others were sentenced to perpetual imprisonment. The events in France led to a series of trials in other locations, not all of which had the same outcome.

Humble origins
The Poor Fellow-Soldiers of Jesus Christ, commonly known as the Knights Templar, originally began  1120, when a group of eight Christian Knights approached Warmund, Patriarch of Jerusalem and requested permission to defend the Kingdom of Jerusalem. Baldwin II of Jerusalem gave them quarters in the Temple of Solomon. Hugues de Payens was elected their master and the Patriarch Warmund charged them with the duty of keeping the roads safe from thieves and others who were routinely robbing and killing pilgrims en route to Jerusalem, which they did  for nine years until the Council of Troyes in 1129, when they became a military order sanctioned by the Church encouraged substantially by the patronage of Bernard of Clairvaux, a leading churchman of the time.  The Rule of the Order was based on that of the Cistercian Order, that of obedience, poverty and chastity. Their role was eventually expanded to fight in the Crusades. The Crusades wound down, and were eventually expelled from the area.

Throughout these years, the Templar Order became wealthy and powerful. They received massive donations of money, manors, churches, even villages and the revenues thereof, from Kings and European nobles interested in helping with the fight for the Holy Land. The Templars, by order of the Pope, were exempt from all taxes, tolls and tithes, their houses and churches were given the right to asylum and were exempt from feudal obligations.  They were answerable only to the Pope.

Events in France

Prelude
While the Templars had started off well and were at times considered the model of Christian knighthood, it was not long before resentment of their privileges, of their being "rich as kings", and criticism of some of their actions in war began to surface. For example, at the siege of Damascus in 1148, the Templars as well as the Hospitallers were accused of accepting bribes to convince King Conrad III of Germany to abandon the effort. There was other criticism of their actions as well. Following the disastrous battle at the Horns of Hattin and the subsequent fall of Jerusalem, which some blamed on the Templars; they were left with almost no discernible military purpose in the Holy Land. Other critics also questioned their morals. The chronicler William of Tyre was often critical of the order and in one instance accused them of ransoming Nasr-al-Din, the sultan's son, for six thousand gold florins. When the Grand Master Odo de St Amand died in 1179, William called him "a wicked man, haughty and arrogant, in whose nostrils dwelt the spirit of a fury, one who neither feared God nor revered man" and that he was "mourned by no one". When the Templars took up banking and lending the criticism only increased. Both Walter Map and John of Salisbury accused the Templars of avarice. Matthew Paris sometimes praised them while at other times was severely critical of the Templars. The loss of the last foothold in Syria, Tortosa in 1302, was yet another failure that left them vulnerable to their critics. As the obvious surprise and shock of their arrests in 1307 indicate, nobody thought the Order was flawed to the point it needed disbanding.

During this time period the power of the papacy had declined and most of the popes of the twelfth and thirteenth centuries found themselves either fleeing Rome or not allowed to enter at all. Also at this time antipopes backed by the German Emperors were common fixtures in the Emperors' bitter struggle with the Church. One of the last thirteenth century popes was Peter Morrone, an old man selected to be pope as a compromise, who as Pope Celestine V proved too old and too ineffective to rule the Church and upon realizing this himself, he abdicated. This caused a tremendous protest throughout the western Church and had a divisive effect on the next pope, Boniface VIII. Pope Boniface was in many ways the opposite of his predecessor in that he was very capable, determined and even bold, but many held that a pope could not abdicate and that Celestine remained the true pope. Boniface in turn captured the old pope, who had sought nothing more than to retire in peace, imprisoning him until his death in 1296. Boniface VIII continued to impose his control on secular authorities, Edward I of England and Philip IV of France, who both protested against his authority, but Philip IV of France proved his most formidable opponent. Philip attempted to tax the church, which Boniface refused, beginning a long series of struggles between the two. Finally in 1303 Guillaume de Nogaret, Philip IV's lawyer drew up a list of 29 charges including black magic, sodomy, heresy and blasphemy against Pope Boniface. In turn Boniface announced that he intended to place the kingdom of France under interdict. This threat to Philip might have led to revolution so de Nogaret and Sciarra Colonna leading a force of 1600 men attacked Anagni, where the pope was in residence, captured Boniface and for three days held him prisoner. After four days however the residents of Anagni rose up and expelled the invaders and took Boniface to Rome in triumph. But the ordeal had been too much for the 86‑year‑old pope and he died days later. Philip IV was determined not to have a pope interfere with his plans again and after a year the conclave was still unable to decide, so an outsider was suggested in the person of Bernard de Goth, Archbishop of Bordeaux. He had been a supporter of Boniface, but Philip arranged a meeting promising to support him as pope if he would certain conditions, including reconciliations between France and the Church and absolution for any of Philip's men who had fought and captured Boniface. Bernard de Goth became Pope Clement V on November 14, 1305.

Philip IV of France, like his predecessors, employed Templars in his royal treasury in Paris to oversee a variety of financial functions of the French kingdom. There was little to indicate he had less than full trust in their integrity. In 1299, the Order loaned Philip the substantial sum of five hundred thousand livres for the dowry of his sister as well as his need of funds to fight the Flemish War, at which time he imposed taxes until his subjects were in revolt. When he debased the coinage, it led to an insurrection in Paris. The Knight Templar defended and gave the king refuge during the incident. But Philip had a history of seizing property and persons when it suited his needs, such as from the Lombards in 1291 and the Jews in 1306. In a meeting between Grand Master Molay and the pope, in either March or April 1307, the discussion revolved around problems in the order. In turn, in a letter to the King, Clement V told Philip that he intended a full investigation of the Templar order  (Latin: on/concerning the state of the Templars) in mid-October later that year. About a week before his planned formal investigation Clement V received a surprising message that members of the order had been arrested, imprisoned and charged with heresy by an inquisition the pope had not convened.

Plan and the arrest
On September 14, 1307, all bailiffs and seneschals in the kingdom of France were sent secret orders from King Philip IV ordering preparations to be made for the arrest and imprisonment of all members of the Order of Templars; the arrests were to be executed a month later. At dawn on October 13, 1307, the soldiers of King Philip IV then captured all Templars found in France. Clement V, initially incensed at this flagrant disregard for his authority, nonetheless relented, and on November 22, 1307, issued a papal decree ordering all monarchs of the Christian faith to arrest all Templars and confiscate their lands in the name of the Pope and the Church. The order went out to England, Iberia, Germany, Italy and Cyprus. The leader, Templar Grand Master Jacques de Molay, and Hugues de Pairaud, a Templar, referred to in various documents as "the visitor of France", who was the collector of all of the royal revenues of France owing to the Order, were both arrested, as were many other Templars in France.

Philip used his ministers and agents Guillaume de Nogaret and Enguerrand de Marigny who collected a list of charges against the Templars. Other witnesses were said to have been made up of expelled Templar members, previously removed for their misdeeds. Under the orders of the French king, they were arrested and severely tortured.

Soon after, in 1307, the Pope sent two cardinals to interview Jacques de Molay and Hugues de Pairaud.  At that time they recanted their confessions and told the other Templars to do the same.

The specific charge of heresy
Several significant changes in legal procedures had been made by 1230 that affected later trials, especially those of the Templars. No longer did a witness need fear reprisals if his accusations were proved untrue. Instead, a new system relying on the testimony of witnesses, judicial latitudes and the inquisitorial procedure began to dominate criminal trials in most of Europe. In France, the issuance of Cupientes in 1229 by Louis IX of France, Philip's grandfather, gave the kings of France the duty to eliminate heresy in his kingdom. Additionally, from 1230 on, the inquisitors in northern Italy had been given special powers by Pope Honorius III which allowed them to examine even the exempted and protected orders of the Hospitallers, Cistercians and Templars, but only in cases where heresy was suspected. When the Albigensian Crusade was over, these special powers were never revoked but simply forgotten. Philip's royal lawyers concentrated their charges on this one vulnerable exception, that of heresy, to an otherwise untouchable order, one which answered only to the Pope.

Charges against the Templars

The initial charge against the Templars was heresy; more specifically "when professing, the brothers were required to deny Christ, to spit on the Cross, and to place three 'obscene kisses' on the lower spine, the navel and the mouth; they were obliged to indulge in carnal relations with other members of the order, if requested; and finally they wore a small belt which had been consecrated by touching a strange idol, which looked like a human head with a long beard." On August 12, 1308, the charges would be increased stating that the Templars worshipped idols, specifically made of a cat and a head, the latter having three faces. The lists of articles 86 to 127[3] would add many other charges. None of these "idols" were ever produced.

The inquisitional trials 
Of the various trials held in France, the first, and one of the larger trials, ran from October 19 to November 24, 1307, and was held in Paris. A total of 138 prisoners gave a full testimony and almost all admitted guilt to one or more charges. Since torture was used to elicit these confessions, the reliability of their testimony before this and other inquisitional tribunals remains an open question. What is known is these earlier confessions contradicted later testimony before the 1310 papal commissions in Paris. Another important trial that was held at Poitiers between 28 June and 2 July 1308 where at least 54 Templars testified before the pope and his commission of cardinals. Here too a considerable number of defendants confessed to one or more of the charges. When asked if their statements were freely given many said that, while they had been tortured or threatened, restricted to bread and water and other forms of harsh treatments had been imposed on them, their confessions were not the results of any torture. But in 1310 at least three said they had lied in front of the Pope and now wished to defend the order.

Templar Peter (Pierre) of Bologna was trained as a canon lawyer and was the Templar representative to the papal court in Rome. On April 23, 1310, Peter, with others, went before the commission and demanded what amounts to full disclosure of their accusers and all the information and evidence gathered in the case. They also requested a ban on witnesses conversing with one another, and that all proceedings should be kept secret until they were sent to the Pope. In May 1310, the Archbishop of Sens, Philippe de Marigny, took over the trial of the Templars from the original commission. De Marigny conducted the proceedings against the Templars until his death in 1316. Pope Clement V interceded and directed that actual trials take place; however, Philip sought to thwart this effort, and had several Templars burned at the stake as heretics to prevent their participation in the trials. Two days after this change, 54 Templars were burned outside of Paris. When the papal commission met on November 3, 1310, they found the Templars had no defenders and adjourned until December 27. At this time the prisoners insisted that Peter de Bologna and Renaud de Provins again defend them but were told the two priests had appeared before the commission of the Archbishop of Sens and that both de Provins and de Bologna were found guilty and had been imprisoned. Peter de Bologna, however, had managed to escape his confinement.

Recantation and death of Templar leaders in France
Eventually King Philip's Inquisitors succeeded in making Jacques de Molay confess to the charges. On March 18, 1314, de Molay and de Charney recanted their confessions, stating they were innocent of the charges and they were only guilty of betraying their Order by confessing under duress to something they had not done. They were immediately found guilty of being relapsed heretics, for which the punishment was death. This effectively silenced the other Templars. Philip continued to pressure and threaten the Pope to officially disband the Order, and things came to a dramatic end in 1314 with the public execution by burning of leader Jacques de Molay and Geoffroi de Charney.

Trial timeline in France

*Source for the majority of this timeline: Malcolm Barber, Trials p. 258

Outcome
After commissions of the Council of Vienne had reviewed all documents regarding the Templars, on March 22, 1312, Clement V issued the Papal bull  suppressing the Order of the Templars. In May 1312 by the bull Ad Providam he provided that all assets of the Order of the Temple were to be given to Knights Hospitaller, to maintain the original purposes of the gifts to aid the Holy Land. It further made a distinction between Templars who remained unrepentant and those not found guilty of any crimes or who had been reconciled to the Church. Philip IV, however, confiscated a huge sum from them in "compensation" for the "costs" of the proceedings against the Templars. Also, in England where inventories were made of Templar lands and assets, the papal order had no immediate effect. There were so many delays and stalling in handing over these lands that even as late as 1338 the Hospitallers had only nominal control of former Templar lands.

Trials in England, Ireland and Scotland

In 1307, the Templar Order in the British Isles was thought to be rich in possessions but few in members. At the time of the arrest of the Templars in France, Edward II doubted the accusations against the Order and summoned Guienne de Dene, his seneschal in Agen to give his account of the matter. Upon reading the report Edward was still unconvinced and on October 30 sent letters to Pope Clement V, and to the Kings of Portugal, Castile, Aragon and Sicily defending the Order of the Templars and encouraged them to do the same. Edward then wrote again to the Pope on December 10 in which he states: "he is unable to credit the horrible charges against the Knights Templar who everywhere bear a good name in England". He also requests more proof of the accusations and noted that the financial and other dealings between the English monarchy and the Templars had always been straightforward and honest, and that they had fought alongside King Richard in the defense of the Holy Land. On December 20, 1307, he received the order from the Pope to arrest the Templars. Edward finally issued orders to his officers to arrest all Templars in England, Ireland and Scotland, and to confiscate and inventory all their properties. But despite the Pope's order, Edward went about the handling of the Templars in a very different way than Philip. Many Templars were allowed an easy confinement, received allowances and remained in relative comfort. In 1308 the situation changed with the exile of Edward's favorite, Piers Gaveston. Edward requested help from both Clement V and Philip IV in order to have Gaveston returned to England. In turn it was perhaps more than coincidental he hardened his attitude towards the Templars.

On September 13, 1309, two Inquisitors were brought to England and allowed to question the Templars but in the presence of English prelates and as of November 1309, none of the Templars would confess to the charges. At that time torture was rarely used in England, while the legal system was well-formed and used regular jurors as opposed to the "professional witness, accusers and jurors" frequently used by Philip as tools to enforce his will. In December, the Pope put pressure on England and other countries to allow the Inquisitors to use "their" methods, namely torture, and reluctant approval was given by the King of England. The conditions that the Templars were living in were radically changed and, as with continued pressure by the Pope and Inquisition on the King and local prelates, the inevitable result was obtained. The English Templars were sent to the Count of Ponthieu which did not adhere to English Law. Various confessions, different in many ways, were nonetheless obtained and the Templars were either executed or sent to prison for life. Two Templars, both from England, were examined by the Bishop of St. Andrews in Scotland and ended up with confessions of minor offenses, while in Ireland, fourteen Templars subjected to three trials netted likewise minor confessions that amounted to nothing.

Trials in Cyprus
The Templars, along with the Hospitallers had moved their main bases of operations to Cyprus after the fall of Acre in 1291. The Hospitallers, however, attacked and in 1308 captured the island of Rhodes and moved their headquarters there leaving Cyprus to the Templars. This made Cyprus of particular importance to the pope since it was now the Templar base of operations. In May 1308 a letter from the pope was brought to Cyprus by Prior Hayden which ordered the arrest of all the Templars on the island. Amalric, Prince of Tyre was ruling Cyprus at the time and had overthrown his brother Henry II of Cyprus with the help of the Templars. Amalric was slow to implement the arrests giving the Templar knights ample time to prepare their defenses. But in June the Templars surrendered, their properties and treasure seized, and they were held at Khirokitia and later Yermasoyia, then finally Pano Lefkara, where they remained for three years. May 1310 found king Henry II restored to his throne and unlike his brother he complied with the pope's demands to bring them to trial. They seemed to have received a fair trial in spite of Henry II's dislike for the order. All seventy-six Templars denied the charges and numerous witnesses testified as to their innocence. The trials ended in acquitting all Templars of all charges. The pope demanded Henry II hold new trials and sent a personal delegate, Dominic of Palestrina, to insure the pope's wishes were carried out. The result of the 1311 trials was not recorded but they were still in prison when the pope decreed the order to disband the order and transfer all their possessions to the Hospitallers. But the Hospitallers received the properties only, the treasure and movable goods were retained by Cypriot authorities to cover the unusually high costs of the trials. The leaders were never released and died in prison.

Events in Germany
The records in Germany of Templars, not nearly as numerous in Germany as in France, drew little attention in German annals and chronicles. Proving how little was actually known in Germany regarding the demise of the Templars, one annalist recorded the Templars were destroyed, with the approval of Emperor Henry, for their collusion with the Saracens and for the reason they intended to establish a new empire for themselves. The writers were not even aware of the actual charges leveled by Philip IV of France. But in a letter by the German king, Albert I of Germany, dated January 13, 1308, replying to Philip IV of France, the king expressed himself regarding the arrests of the Templars. He wrote, "although a crime of such evil infamy ought to be reprehensible and damnable in all persons, nevertheless it is known to be more reprehensible among the religious, who ought by the splendour of their life to be mirror for others and an example".

The actions taken against Templars in Germany varied by provence.  of Magdeburg, appointed prince-archbishop in 1307, was already hostile towards the Templars, and in 1308 ordered the Templars in his province seized. He had some Templars burned and then attempted to keep their property for himself which led to a war with the Templars. In 1318, the Hospitallers had still not received the Templar property from him and as Clement was dead, they complained to Pope John XXII. Despite the orders of the papal bull issued in 1307, and other than the events in Magdeburgh, the papal orders received little attention in Germany. At times witnesses found the Templars innocent though the Pope was adamant.

In 1310 at Trier near Luxembourg, an inquest with seventeen witnesses, including three Templars, was heard. Though their property was seized, they were acquitted. At Mainz, the Templars' leaders testified that since the crosses on the mantle of the Templars did not burn, it was a miracle and a sign of their innocence. Despite mounting pressure, popular opinion stayed with the Templars. Though they were told by the Pope to go back and do their work, the result again was acquittal.

Events in Spain and Portugal
After the infamous trials of the Templars in France and the subsequent orders of Pope Clement V to dissolve the order, most countries complied, ceding Templar lands to the Hospitallers. Kings Denis of Portugal and James II of Aragon both proclaimed they found no fault of heresy, blasphemy or immorality in the Templars in their respective realms. This was not surprising since the Templars had become key to the success of the Reconquista in Aragon and Portugal and their vast holdings were critical to the continued security of these kingdoms. Ceding the Templar holdings to the Hospitallers posed a threat of foreign control of significant portions of both countries. Both kings sought to circumvent these outcomes and in Aragon King James convinced Pope John XXII in 1317 to form the Order of Montesa which received the bulk of Templar lands in Aragon and Valencia. In Portugal, the result of long negotiations with the pope by King Denis resulted in the formation of another new order, the Order of Christ formed in 1320, which saw not only the vast holdings in Portugal ceded to this new order, but also a great number of Templars themselves quietly joined the order. The problems caused by the downfall of the Knights Templar Orders in Valencia and Portugal were solved by the creation of two new orders, the difference being the Order of Montesa was given Templar and Hospitaller lands while the Order of Christ was simply a transition of the Templars and their holdings in Portugal.

The Chinon Parchment 

Pope Clement V absolved 72 of the Knights Templar in July 1308 at Poitiers after hearing their confessions. However, King Philip still withheld access to the leaders of the Order and it was not until August 1308 that a papal commission finally was allowed to hear from them and also grant them absolution. The evidence of these hearings has been based on indirect evidence until the discovery of the Chinon parchment in September 2001 by Barbara Frale in the Vatican Archives. The document had been previously overlooked by Vatican researchers for some time due to its damaged condition and being misfiled among other unrelated documents. The importance of the Chinon parchment is that it is an authentic copy under the seal of three of the cardinals sent by Clement V, Bérenger Frédol,  and Landolfo Brancaccio, who were authorized to judge the Templars in his name. There was another account of the trials at Chinon, namely a second-hand report held in the French Chancery, described in the register of Pierre d'Étampes, which was the only available account up until the discovery of the original parchment (and its authentic copy) in the Vatican archives. A comparison between the two shows the French copy provides a somewhat different account of events at Chinon. The Chinon parchment shows the hearings were held by the Church only and that royal lawyers were not present, while the French document gives a different impression, that the official proceedings were held under the auspices of the Pope and the French king. Other discrepancies between the two lead to the conclusion that the French document was an indirect copy based on verbal accounts and not from having access to the original parchment. There is one unresolved question as to the chronology, however. In the bull  (showing mercy) the Pope, Clement V, announced to Philip IV that Jacques de Molay and the other Templar leaders were absolved and reconciled to the Church; and that any power to judge them again was reserved to the Pope alone. This bull was dated 12 August 1308, eight days before the hearings with these leaders was actually held. Whether this was an internal error in dating or the Pope was certain of the outcome before the hearings is not known and needs to be investigated further. While it remains less than clear as to what exactly happened at Chinon castle between August 17–20, 1308, further investigations may provide new answers.

Notes

References

Further reading
  Alain Demurger, La persécution des templiers. Journal, 1307-1314, Paris, Payot & Rivage, 2015.
 Sean L. Field, "Royal Agents and Templar Confessions in the Bailliage of Rouen", French Historical Studies, 39/1, 2016, p. 35–71.
 Sean L. Field, "Torture and Confession in the Templar Interrogations at Caen, 28-29 October 1307", Speculum, 91/2, 2016, p. 297–327.
Addison, C. G., The Knights Templar History New York; Macoy Publishing and Masonic Supply Co. 1912. (reprinted 1978)

Julien Théry, "Philip the Fair, the Trial of the 'Perfidious Templars' and the Pontificalization of the French Monarchy", in Journal of Medieval Religious Culture, 39/2 (2013), pp. 117-148, online
Julien Théry-Astruc, "The Flight of the Master of Lombardy (13 February 1308) and Clément V's Strategy in the Templar Affair : A Slap in the Pope's Face", Rivista di storia della Chiesa in Italia, 70/1 (2016), p. 35-44, online.

Knights Templar
Trials in France
Inquisition
Catholicism in the Middle Ages